Pinchuk's goby (Ponticola cephalargoides) is a species of goby native to the Black Sea and the Sea of Azov.

Characteristics
The body of adults is prolonged, not very high.  Only juveniles have high and short body. Сaudal peduncle is very high (highest between al representatives of genus Ponticola), short and flattened from sides (its high is equal its length). The scales on the caudal peduncle are not very big. Head is flattened from sides, snout profile is round, cheeks are round. Superior lip is broad, relatively short. Premaxilla short (especially in juveniles), with sparse strong lips. First dorsal fin is rounded, has a narrow yellow-orange stripe on the edge.  This species can reach a length of  NG.

Range
In the northwestern and northeastern parts of the Black Sea, also in some parts of the Sea of Azov. Habits same habitats with the ratan goby Ponticola ratan. With the flatsnout goby Ponticola platyrostris is separated geographically.

References

Ponticola
Fish of Europe
Fish of the Black Sea
Fish described in 1976